The 1961 PGA Tour season was played from January 6 to December 10. The season consisted of 48 official money events. Arnold Palmer won the most tournaments, six, and there were nine first-time winners. Gary Player was the leading money winner with earnings of $64,540. Jerry Barber was voted the PGA Player of the Year and Palmer won the Vardon Trophy for the lowest scoring average.

Schedule
The following table lists official events during the 1961 season.

Unofficial events
The following events were sanctioned by the PGA Tour, but did not carry official money, nor were wins official.

Money leaders
The money list was based on prize money won during the season, calculated in U.S. dollars.

Awards

Notes

References

External links
PGA Tour official site

PGA Tour seasons
PGA Tour